Miriam Tamara Griffin (née Dressler; 6 June 1935 – 16 May 2018) was an American classical scholar and tutor of ancient history at Somerville College at the University of Oxford from 1967 to 2002. She was a scholar of Roman history and ancient thought, and wrote books on the Emperor Nero and his tutor, Seneca, encouraging an appreciation of the philosophical writings of the ancient Romans within their historical context.

Early life and education 
Griffin was born and brought up in New York City. She was the only child of Jewish parents, Fanny Dressler (née Natelson) and Leo Dressler. Fanny Dressler was a stenographer and Leo Dressler was a school teacher.

Griffin attended Erasmus Hall High School in New York. Griffin's alma mater was Barnard College, Columbia University in New York City, from which she graduated with a BA degree in 1956. She had an AM degree from Radcliffe College of Harvard University, Massachusetts. She attended the University of Oxford as a Fulbright scholar in 1957. Her alma mater at the University of Oxford was St Anne's College, where she matriculated in 1957. She graduated with a first in "Greats" in 1960. Griffin completed her DPhil at the University of Oxford in 1968.  Her thesis was supervised by Ronald Syme, and entitled Seneca: The Statesman and the Writer.

Career 
Griffin held a Junior Research Fellowship at St Anne's College, University of Oxford, before being appointed Tutor in Ancient History at Somerville College in 1967.  Her research interests included Roman history, the late Republic and early Empire, and intellectual history. She was described as "a generous, kind and warm colleague and a mentor to generations of students".

Griffin was a scholar of the Julio-Claudian imperial dynasty and ancient philosophy. Her book Seneca: a Philosopher in Politics (1976) examined the tensions between philosophy and politics in the life and career of Seneca. The volume was described by reviewers as "a work of consequence" and an "authoritative book".

Griffin's book Nero: The End of a Dynasty was first published in 1984, and republished in 2000 and 2013. It was translated into French by Alexis D'Hautcourt and published as Néron, ou, La fin d'une dynastie in 2002. Griffin places Nero as a person, including "his desire for popularity and his fear and insecurity", in the context of the social and legislative structures of his time, and examines the ways in which this contributed to his downfall. She said in an interview with The New York Times that "Nero was a man of taste, rather than intellect, and by the time of his death, I think, he was losing his mental balance". The incipient rebellion against his rule threw him into a state of panic, she added, exacerbated by his persecutory delusions. Her work was reviewed as a "splendid book", a "perceptive study", and "close to giving us the definitive account of the last and worst of the Julio-Claudians".

Griffin edited the journal The Classical Quarterly (2002–2007). She was a long-standing editor of the Clarendon Ancient History Series for Oxford University Press.

In 2011, Griffin gave the Nineteenth Todd Memorial Lecture at the University of Sydney on the topic of 'Symptoms and Sympathy in Latin Letters'. Griffin was one of five women to deliver the lecture in its history.

In 2013, Griffin was on the Steering Committee of the Oxford Classics Conclave, which hosted a dinner to which all women engaged in classics teaching or research at Oxford were invited.  Sixty-two women were invited to celebrate their increased presence on the faculty. Griffin arranged to hold the first Women in Classics dinner at her current institution, Somerville College, where thirty-one women attended on 5 October 2013. The steering committee also included Josephine Crawley Quinn, Susan Treggiari, and Gail Trimble.

Griffin taught Gillian Clark and Tessa Rajak as undergraduates. Her doctoral students include Hannah Cotton, Professor in Classics at the Hebrew University of Jerusalem, Kathleen Coleman, James Loeb Professor of the Classics at Harvard University and David Wardle, Professor of Classics and Acting Dean of the Faculty of Humanities at the University of Cape Town.

A volume of Griffin's collected papers, edited by Catalina Balmaceda, is due to be published in June 2018 by Oxford University Press. The volume is entitled Politics and Philosophy at Rome: Collected Papers, and includes previously unpublished lectures.

Personal life 
Griffin had a lifelong passion for music, and was an accomplished pianist. She was married to Jasper Griffin of Balliol College. They met as students at Oxford and married in New York after their examinations in the summer of 1960. The couple had three daughters—Julia Griffin, Miranda Williams, and Tamara Sykorova—and a granddaughter.

Honours
In 2002, Griffin was the dedicatee of a Festschrift in honour of her career titled Philosophy and Power in the Graeco-Roman World: Essays in Honour of Miriam Griffin (2002). On 20 August 2018, she was awarded the British Academy Medal in recognition of "lifetime achievement".

Selected bibliography 
Griffin published articles in academic journals in both fields, as well as contributing to 61 reference entries in the Oxford Classical Dictionary, 3rd rev. ed. (2005).  She wrote reviews and articles in the London Review of Books and The New York Review of Books.

Books
 Seneca: a philosopher in politics. Clarendon Press, 1976. .
 Nero: the end of a dynasty. Batsford, 1984. .  This details the events of Nero's reign and then analyses the reasons for his downfall.
 Seneca on society. Oxford University Press, 2013. .

Edited collections
 Philosophia Togata I. Essays on Philosophy and Roman Society. Edited by Miriam Griffin and Jonathan Barnes. Oxford University Press, 1997. .
 Philosophia Togata II. Plato and Aristotle at Rome. Edited by Jonathan Barnes and Miriam Griffin. Oxford University Press, 2000. .
 A Companion to Julius Caesar. Edited by Miriam Griffin. Wiley, 2009. .
 Health and Sickness in Ancient Rome; Greek and Roman Poetry and Historiography. Edited by Francis Cairns and Miriam Griffin. Francis Cairns, 2010. .
 Studies in Stoicism. P. A. Brunt. Edited by Miriam Griffin, Alison Samuels, and with the assistance of Michael Crawford. Oxford University Press, 2013. .

Translations
On Benefits. Lucius Annaeus Seneca. Translated by Miriam Griffin and Brad Inwood. University of Chicago Press, 2011. .

Edited texts
Cicero:  On  Duties. Edited  by  M.  T.  Griffin  and  E.  M.  Atkins. Cambridge University Press, 1991. .
"Cicero on Life and Death." Translated by John Davie.  Edited with an introduction and Notes by Miriam T. Griffin.  World's Classics. Oxford University Press, 2017.  .

Articles 

 'De Brevitate Vitae', The Journal of Roman Studies, Vol. 52, Parts 1 and 2 (1962), pp. 104–113
 'Seneca on Cato's Politics: Epistle 14. 12-13', The Classical Quarterly, New Series, Vol. 18, No. 2 (Nov., 1968), pp. 373–375             
 'The 'Leges Iudiciariae' of the Pre-Sullan Era', The Classical Quarterly , Vol. 23, No. 1 (May, 1973), pp. 108–126

References

Sources

External links 
Institutional homepage (Somerville College, Oxford)
Institutional homepage (Classics Faculty, Oxford)

1935 births
2018 deaths
American classical scholars
Women classical scholars
American women historians
American people of Jewish descent
Alumni of Somerville College, Oxford
Radcliffe College alumni
Barnard College alumni
Academics of the University of Oxford
Writers from New York City
20th-century American historians
20th-century American women writers
21st-century American historians
21st-century American women writers
Fellows of Somerville College, Oxford
Historians from New York (state)